Measham railway station is a disused railway station that formerly served the village of Measham, North West Leicestershire from 1874 to 1931. The station was on the Ashby and Nuneaton Joint Railway. The station is the only building on the Ashby - Shackerstone section to still be in situ. The trackbed has since been filled in and is now a footpath to Moira. The goods shed is also still standing at Measham.

{
  "type": "FeatureCollection",
  "features": [
    {
      "type": "Feature",
      "properties": {},
      "geometry": {
        "type": "Point",
        "coordinates": [
          -1.5093,
          52.7039
        ]
      }
    }
  ]
}

References

External links
http://www.midlandrailway.org.uk/occasional-papers/donisthorpe/
http://www.shackerstonefestival.co.uk/ANJR/Hdonisthorpe_station.htm
http://podahistory.blogspot.com/2014/07/donisthorpe-railway-station.html

Disused railway stations in Leicestershire
Former Midland Railway stations
Former London and North Western Railway stations
Railway stations in Great Britain opened in 1874
Railway stations in Great Britain closed in 1931